Molly Kristin Wood (born May 23, 1975) is an American venture capitalist, podcast host, and journalist.

Early life and education
Molly Wood was born in Helena, Montana on May 23, 1975. She graduated in May 1997 with a BA in journalism with a minor in French from the University of Montana. During her senior year she served as the editor of the weekly student newspaper, the Montana Kaimin. Upon graduation, she took a job as a reporter at the Missoulian. In July 1997, she joined the Associated Press, handling a variety of both general news and sports stories in the Western United States.

Career
Molly was the tech correspondent and backup host for the US public radio program Marketplace and its various spinoffs. She also co-hosted the podcast Make Me Smart with Kai Ryssdal. She has previously held positions as an executive editor at CNET.com as well as a writer for the Associated Press, MacHome Journal magazine, O'Reilly Media, and the deputy technology editor for the Business Day section of The New York Times. Wood hosted the Gadgettes podcast with Kelly Morrison, and "The Buzz Report", a technology video news column that was published weekly. She has appeared in mainstream media shows such as Live! With Regis and Kelly, American Public Media's Marketplace, and CNBC's On the Money and was the co-host of the Buzz Out Loud podcast with Tom Merritt, then Brian Tong, which ended in early 2012.

Wood is well known for being the host of CNET tech show Always On, in addition to her podcast It's a Thing, an effort reuniting her with former BOL co-host Tom Merritt. She is also a guest commentator for American Public Media's programs Marketplace and the Marketplace Morning Report. On October 7, 2013, Wood announced she would leave CNET at the end of that month in order to pursue independent projects. She took part in several panels at CES 2014. In January 2014, Wood announced via her personal blog that she would be joining The New York Times.

In March 2015, just over a year after joining the Times, she announced that she was leaving to report and serve as a Silicon Valley correspondent, along with occasional hosting, for American Public Media's Marketplace, a set of public radio programs about business and the economy. Together with Marketplace host Kai Ryssdal, Wood began hosting the Marketplace podcast Make Me Smart with Kai and Molly on November 28, 2016. On September 5, 2017, Wood began hosting the weekday Marketplace Tech program in addition to her role as correspondent with Marketplace. Between 2019 and 2020, she was also a regular contributor to the Ideas section of WIRED.

On November 3, 2021, Molly announced on Twitter that she would be leaving Marketplace to join Jason Calacanis's venture capital firm.

References

1975 births
American women podcasters
American podcasters
People from Helena, Montana
Living people
University of Montana alumni
21st-century American women